Oxymeris trochlea is a species of sea snail, a marine gastropod mollusc in the family Terebridae, the auger snails.

Description
The size of an adult shell varies between 40 mm and 79 mm.

Distribution
This species is found in the Pacific Ocean off the Marquesas Islands.

References

 Bratcher, T., 1969. Rediscovery of Terebra cochlea Deshayes. The Veliger 11(4): 334-335
 Bratcher T. & Cernohorsky W.O. (1987). Living terebras of the world. A monograph of the recent Terebridae of the world. American Malacologists, Melbourne, Florida & Burlington, Massachusetts. 240pp
 Terryn Y. (2007). Terebridae: A Collectors Guide. Conchbooks & NaturalArt. 59pp + plates

External links
 
 Deshayes, G. P. (1857). Description d'espèces nouvelles du genre Terebra. Journal de Conchyliologie. 6 (1): 65-102
 Fedosov, A. E.; Malcolm, G.; Terryn, Y.; Gorson, J.; Modica, M. V.; Holford, M.; Puillandre, N. (2020). Phylogenetic classification of the family Terebridae (Neogastropoda: Conoidea). Journal of Molluscan Studies. 85(4): 359-388

Terebridae
Gastropods described in 1857